The table below gives the total fertility rate (TFR) of various British counties/UAs in 2006.

The below table gives the TFR of various British local authorities in 2006.

References

Demographics of England
Fertility